Arroyo Peligroso (Dangerous Creek) is the first EP by Colombian musician and singer-songwriter Joe Arroyo, released on March 16, 2004 under the label of Discos Fuentes. After the end of his contract with Sony Music, Arroyo decided to return to Discos Fuentes. This album offers a more commercial, folkloric rhythm and a mild introduction to his upcoming album Se Armo la Moña en Carnaval (2005). It had two hits in Colombia: "La Fundillo Loco" and "El Torito". It was released at the beginning of the year, coinciding with the Carnival of Barranquilla. Popular legend in Barranquilla has it that "La Fundillo Loco" was dedicated to his ex Mary.

Track listing

Personnel 
Many people were involved in the production:

Musicians

 Joe Arroyo – composer, vocals
 Jorge Grajales – background vocals
 Alvaro Pava – background vocals
 Juan David – background vocals
 Morists Jiménez – background, trombone
 Luis Bolívar – lead guitar (electric)
 Edgardo Fabregas – bass, bajo sexto
 Giovanny Montoya – bass

 Ramón Benítez – bombard
 Diego Galé – bongo drum, conga, maracas, güiro
 Carlos Piña – saxophone, guache
 Ostual Serna – tres
 Hugo Fernández – trumpet
 Chelito De Castro – instrumentation, piano

Production
 Líliana Guarín – graphic design
 Julio Estrada – keyboard programming
 Jorge Parra Jr. – keyboard programming
 Gabriel Gutierrez – mastering
 Darío De Castro – arranger, production
 Cheo Feliciano – composer
 Gustavo Rada – composer

References

Joe Arroyo EPs
Discos Fuentes EPs
2004 EPs
Spanish-language EPs